CBHA may refer to:

 CBHA-FM, a radio station (90.5 FM) licensed to Halifax, Nova Scotia, Canada
 Community-based Housing Association
 chiral bishydroxamic acid - used in asymmetric synthesis
 Consortium of British Humanitarian Agencies
 Canadian Ball Hockey Association
 Columbia Basin Health Association